The National House of Traditional Leaders is a body of 23 traditional leaders in South Africa, representing the eight provincial Houses of Traditional Leaders. Until 1998 it was called the National Council of Traditional Leaders.

Its role includes advising the President on matters relating to customary law.

See also  
 Ntlo ya Dikgosi of Botswana 
 Council of Traditional Leaders of Namibia
 Senate of Lesotho

References

Government of South Africa